Udo Horsmann (born 30 March 1952) is a German former footballer who played for Bayern Munich and was part of their European Cup winning team in 1976.

Honours
Bayern Munich
 European Cup: 1975–76
 European Cup finalist: 1981–82
 Intercontinental Cup: 1976
 Bundesliga: 1979–80, 1980–81
 DFB-Pokal: 1981–82

References

External links
 

1952 births
Living people
German footballers
West German footballers
Association football defenders
UEFA Champions League winning players
Bundesliga players
2. Bundesliga players
Ligue 1 players
FC Bayern Munich footballers
TSV 1860 Munich players
Stade Rennais F.C. players
1. FC Nürnberg players
West German expatriate sportspeople in France
West German expatriate footballers
Expatriate footballers in France